In botany, an auricle is a small ear-like projection from the base of a leaf or petal.

References
Dictionary of Botany

Plant morphology